The Oso (or Osu) is a small coastal river in the southeast of the department of Corse-du-Sud, Corsica, France.

Course

It crosses the communes of Lecci, Porto-Vecchio, San-Gavino-di-Carbini and Zonza.
The Oso rises to the southwest of the  Monte Calva.

In its upper section the stream is called the Ruisseau de Piscia di Ghjaddu.
A waterfall on this section is one of the regional tourist attractions.
It flows southwest, then southeast, and receives the Ruisseau de Palavesani from the right, which drains the Ospedale Reservoir.
It then flows east and then south, then turns west to enter Stagnolu Bay to the west of Saint-Cyprien.
There are beautiful natural pools for swimming in the mountainous section and in the plains.

Hydrology

Measurements of the river flow were taken at the Lecci station from 1968 to 1980.

Tributaries
The following streams (ruisseaux) are tributaries of the Oso (ordered by length) and sub-tributaries:

 Sant'Antonaccio 
 Filasca 
 Poggi Alti 
 Conca 
 Marginicciu 
 Chiustracciu 
 Palavesani 
 Tresigna 
 Fenaja 
 Orditoju

Notes

Sources

Rivers of Corse-du-Sud
Rivers of France
Coastal basins of the Tyrrhenian Sea in Corsica